Oxanthera brevipes is a species of plant in the family Rutaceae. It is endemic to New Caledonia. It was proposed as a novel species by Benjamin C. Stone based on two specimens, distinguished from other false oranges by a non-articulated petiole. The genus Oxanthera has been synonymized with Citrus, but a name in Citrus does not appear to have been published, and Plants of the World Online regards "Oxanthera brevipes" as an unplaced name.

References

Endemic flora of New Caledonia
Aurantioideae
Vulnerable plants
Taxonomy articles created by Polbot